Platinum is the 17th album released by the jazz fusion group Casiopea in 1987.
The album featured a cover of "Bridge Over Troubled Water"--a song originally written by Paul Simon.

Track listing

LP(28MX-2544) Track listing

CD(UPCY-6538) Track listing

Personnel
CASIOPEA are
Issei Noro - Electric guitar (YAMAHA ISSEI MODEL, FRETLESS GUITAR), Acoustic guitar (D'AGOSTINO GUITAR)
Minoru Mukaiya - Keyboards (YAMAHA DX-7, KX-88, TX-816, QX-1, KORG DSS-1, DSM-1, SG-1, ROLAND D-50, SBX-80 & Acoustic Piano)
Tetsuo Sakurai - Electric Bass  (YAMAHA TETSUO MODEL, BB-5000, Kramer Electric Bass)
Akira Jimbo - Drums (YAMAHA YD-9000 Series, PTT-1, PMC-1, RX-5, AKAI S-900, ZILDJAN CYMBALS, SIMMONS SDS-V)

Additional Musicians
Yukou Kusunoki - Lead Vocal on A2, B1, B5, C9
Djavan - Vocal on A4
Background Vocal on A2, A5, B1 - Cedric Samson, Dina Miller, Amanda Blue, Issei Noro, Yukoh Kusunoki
Background Vocal on A1 - Issei Noro, Yukoh Kusunoki
Background Vocal on B4 - Issei Noro, Tetsuo Sakurai, Minoru Mukaiya, Yukoh Kusunoki
Steve Thornton - Latin Percussion on A3, B3, B5
Earl Gardner - Trumpet on A5, B5
Alex Foster - Alto sax on A5, B5
Lenny Pickett - Tenor sax, Baritone sax on A5, B5
Horns Arrangements - Issei Noro, Lenny Pickett
Additional Synthesizer & Programing on B1 - Andy Heermans

Production
Producer - Issei Noro, Shunsuke Miyazumi
Engineer - Andy Heermans, Les Brockman
Assistant Engineers - Mark Partis, Bryan Rutter
Mixing engineer - Andy Heermans

Executive producer - Katsuki Hagiwara, Shinichi Toyama
Production management - Masato Arai
Management - Osamu Takagi, Fumiaki Takahashi, Katsuhiro Maruichi

Art Direction Design and Illustration - Mitsuo Katsui
Visual Supervisor - Masahiro Tomioka, Miyuki Sawa

Release history

External links

References

1987 albums
Casiopea albums